The Sellout is a 1952 American film noir directed by Gerald Mayer and starring Walter Pidgeon, John Hodiak, Audrey Totter and Paula Raymond.

Plot
Big-city newspaper editor Haven D. Allridge (Pidgeon) starts a crusade against corrupt small-town sheriff Burke (Gomez) after he gets a first-hand taste of Burke's version of justice. Although Burke blackmails Allridge into silence using the misdeeds of Allridge's son-in-law, county prosecutor Randy Stauton (Mitchell), state attorney Chick Johnson (Hodiak) continues the fight.

Cast
 Walter Pidgeon as Haven D. Allridge  
 John Hodiak as Chick Johnson 
 Audrey Totter as Cleo Bethel  
 Paula Raymond as Peggy Stauton  
 Thomas Gomez as Kellwin C. Burke  
 Cameron Mitchell as Randy Stauton  
 Karl Malden as Captain Buck Maxwell  
 Everett Sloane as Nelson S. Tarsson  
 Jonathan Cott as Ned Grayton  
 Frank Cady as Bennie Amboy  
 Hugh Sanders as Judge Neeler  
 Griff Barnett as Attorney General Morrisson  
 Burt Mustin as Elk M. Ludens  
 Whit Bissell as Wilfred Jackson  
 Roy Engel as Sam F. Slaper

Reception
According to MGM records, the film made $434,000 in the US and Canada and $211,000 elsewhere, resulting in a loss of $227,000.

References

External links
 
 
 
 
 

1952 films
1952 crime drama films
American black-and-white films
Film noir
Films about journalists
Films scored by David Buttolph
Metro-Goldwyn-Mayer films
American crime drama films
1950s English-language films
1950s American films